The  also Sagami Trench, Sagami Megathrust, or Sagami Subduction Zone is a long trough, which is the surface expression of the convergent plate boundary where the Philippine Sea Plate is being subducted under the Okhotsk Plate. It stretches from the Boso Triple Junction in the east, where it meets the Japan Trench, to Sagami Bay in the west, where it meets the Nankai Trough. It runs north of the Izu Islands chain and the Izu–Bonin–Mariana Arc (IBM).

Megathrust earthquakes associated with the Sagami Trough, known as Kantō earthquakes, are a major threat to Tokyo and the Kantō Region because of the proximity to a population center (with over 36 million living in Tokyo's metro area, with a total of 43 million living in the Kanto Region) and the magnitude the Sagami Trough can create.

Earthquakes

The Sagami Trough megathrust generated the 1703 Genroku earthquake, which was the greatest rupture along the trough in the last thousand years, and the 1855 (Ansei) and 1923 (Great Kanto or Taisho) earthquakes.

See also
 Suruga Trough

References

Subduction zones